John Aloyce Mrosso (born in Kilimanjaro Region) is a Tanzanian Judge and Former Governing Council Chairman of the Institute of Judicial Administration in Tanzania. He served as a Judge in the High Court of Tanzania and as a Justice of Appeal at the Court of Appeal of the United Republic of Tanzania from 2001 to 2008.

References

Living people
Tanzanian judges
Tanzanian civil servants
20th-century Tanzanian judges
21st-century Tanzanian judges
 People from Kilimanjaro Region
Tanzanian Roman Catholics
 Year of birth missing (living people)